Spartanburg County School District 4 (SCSD4) is a public school district in Spartanburg County, South Carolina, US. Led by superintendent Dr. W. Rallie Liston, the district operates four schools.

List of schools

Primary schools
 Woodruff Primary School

Elementary schools 
 Woodruff Elementary School

Middle and junior high schools
 Woodruff Middle School

High schools
 Woodruff High School

References

External links
Spartanburg School District 4 homepage

School districts in South Carolina
Education in Spartanburg County, South Carolina